Woman to Woman may refer to:

Films
Woman to Woman (1923 film), a British film written by Alfred Hitchcock and starring Betty Compson
Woman to Woman (1929 film), a British film directed by Victor Saville
Woman to Woman (1947 film), a British film starring Adele Dixon and Douglass Montgomery
Woman to Woman (1950 film), a Spanish drama film directed by Luis Lucia

In music
Albums
Woman to Woman (Baccara album), 1999
Woman to Woman (Beverley Craven, Judie Tzuke and Julia Fordham album), 2018
Woman to Woman (Fem2fem album), 1993
Woman to Woman (Keyshia Cole album), 2012
Woman to Woman (Tammy Wynette album), 1974
Woman to Woman, a 1989 album by jazz singer Cleo Laine
Woman to Woman, a 2015 studio album by Esmé Patterson
Woman to Woman: Songs of Survival, a 1999 album by gospel singer Vickie Winans

Songs
"Woman to Woman" (Beverley Craven song), 1990
"Woman to Woman" (Joe Cocker song), 1972
"Woman to Woman" (Shirley Brown song), 1974
"Woman to Woman" (Tammy Wynette song), 1974
Woman to Woman", a 1998 hit by country band The Lynns

Other uses
Woman to Woman (talk show), a US syndicated television show in 1983, hosted by Pat Mitchell
Woman to Woman, a Mississippi Public Broadcasting show hosted by Pat Fordice and Juanita Sims Doty
Woman to Woman: Candid Conversations from Me to You, a 2007 book by Christian writer Joyce Meyer
Woman to Woman (play), a 1921 play by the British writer Michael Morton
Woman to Woman (campaign), election campaign in the United Kingdom

See also
Kvinna Till Kvinna (English translation: Woman to Woman), a Swedish women's organisation